Alofa Alofa (born 12 March 1991) is a Samoan international rugby union footballer who plays as a centre for Harlequins in the English Gallagher Premiership.

Background
Alofa was born in Auckland, New Zealand but emigrated to Australia with his family aged four.

Career

Rugby League
He started out his professional career in rugby league with the Sydney Roosters, and switched to union in 2013.

Rugby Union
He scored 13 tries during the 2013 Shute Shield season, this brought him to the attention of the  who named him in their wider training group for the 2014 Super Rugby season. Alofa made his first appearance in week 1 of the campaign and marked his debut with a try in a 43-21 win over the Western in Sydney.

Internationally, Alofa was eligible to play for New Zealand due to it being the country of his birth. He was also able to play for the Wallabies by virtue of residency, and Samoa through his Samoan born parents, the Samoan ministers Kaisala and Tusi. On 14 November 2014, he made his international debut for Samoa against Canada, starting on the right wing.

References

External links

1991 births
Living people
Australian rugby union players
Australian rugby league players
Australian sportspeople of Samoan descent
Samoa international rugby union players
New South Wales Waratahs players
Stade Rochelais players
Newtown Jets NSW Cup players
Rugby union wings
New Zealand emigrants to Australia
Rugby union players from Auckland
People educated at Canterbury Boys' High School
Expatriate rugby union players
Expatriate rugby union players in France
Rugby league players from Auckland
Rugby league fullbacks